Elections for the London Borough of Wandsworth Council were held on 6 May 2010. All 20 3-member wards were up for election, for a total of 60 councillors. The 2010 General Election and other local elections took place on the same day.

The Conservative Party were defending a strong position on the council, having 51 councillors previously elected and having maintained overall control of the council since 1978. The Labour Party were hoping to increase their representation from 9 councillors, and the Liberal Democrats and other parties were hoping to secure representation on the council.

Summary of results

References

2010
2010 London Borough council elections
May 2010 events in the United Kingdom